Queen of the Gas Station  is a 1963 Soviet comedy film directed by Olexiy Myshurin and Nikolai Litus. The events of the movie revolve around a gas station on a highway between Kyiv and Kharkiv, filmed in Pyriatyn, Poltava Oblast.

Plot
Poltava resident Lyudmyla Dobryvechir tries become an announcer on television but does not pass the audition because of her terrible diction. She dreams of becoming a flight attendant on the Tu-104 — but this also does not come to pass. Now Lyudmyla is once again preparing to enter the ensemble "Ballet on Ice". She compensates the lack of ice with training on roller skates and temporarily finds work as a tanker at a gas station. Not everything works out for the new worker, but cheerful disposition and resourcefulness help her not only to master a new specialty, but also radically rebuild the industry of the entire gas station.

Cast 
Nadezhda Rumyantseva - Lyudmyla Dobryvechir (Dobryvechir means good evening in Ukrainian)
Andriy Sova - Panas Petrovych, Head of the Gas Station
Alexei Kozhevnikov - Taras Shpychko, the driver of the UAZ with a portable film projector
Nonna Koperzhynska - Rohnіda Karpivna, barmaid at the gas station
Yuri Belov - Slavko Koshovyi, driver of intercity passenger bus
Vladimir Belokurov - Olexandr Yukhymovych Vedmid' ("Bear"), the driver of the first class
Sergei Blinnikov - Comrade Babiy
Victor Myagky - Comrade Borshch, road chief
Mykola Yakovenko - Comrade Lopata, road chief
Evgenia Opalova - teacher
Viktor Khalatov - the seller in a department store
Pavlo Vynnyk - Podorozhniy, Senior Lieutenant, Automobile Inspector
Alexander Khvylya - bus passenger, priest
Sergey Shemetilo - freight forwarder
Mikhail Kramar - driver
Nikolay Panasiev - Valeriy Hrach, Slavko's partner

References

External links

1963 films
Soviet-era Ukrainian films
Dovzhenko Film Studios films
Ukrainian-language films
1963 comedy films
Films set in Ukraine
Films set in the Soviet Union
Films shot in Ukraine
Russian comedy films
Ukrainian comedy films
Soviet comedy films